Nymphargus balionota is a species of frog in the family Centrolenidae. It is found in the Andes of Colombia (Cordillera Occidental: Cauca and Valle del Cauca Departments) and Ecuador (Carchi and Pichincha Provinces). Common names Mindo Cochran frog and mottled glassfrog has been coined for it.

Description
Adult males measure  in snout–vent length. The head is much wider than the body and the snout is truncate. The fingers have later fringes and some webbing between the outer fingers whereas the toes are about three-fourths webbed. The fingers have discs that are slightly larger than toe discs. The dorsum is pale green and has reddish brown stripes and flecks and elevated yellow spots.

Habitat and conservation
It is an arboreal species. The eggs are laid on leaves overhanging streams.

This species is reasonably common in Colombia. No recent records exist from Ecuador, although it was abundant there at the type locality in 1975. It is threatened by habitat loss (deforestation) caused by agriculture, logging, and human settlements.

References

balionota
Amphibians of the Andes
Amphibians of Colombia
Amphibians of Ecuador
Amphibians described in 1981
Taxa named by William Edward Duellman
Taxonomy articles created by Polbot
Taxobox binomials not recognized by IUCN